Johann Wilhelm Normann Munthe (27 July 1864 – 13 May 1935) was a Norwegian military officer and art collector.

Biography
Munthe was born in Bergen, Norway. He received a military education at the Cavalry Cadet School (Kavaleriets underoffiserskole)  in Trondheim.
He  emigrated to China in 1886, and first started working with the  Chinese Maritime Customs Service. He enlisted in the Chinese Army during the First Sino-Japanese War (1894–95).  Munthe had mastered the Mandarin Chinese language  and remained as a cavalry instructor under General Yuan Shikai.  Munthe's association with Yuan Shikai proved advantageous.  He  advanced in rank to lieutenant General and Chief of Legation Quarters Beijing. He was also an advisor to the Ministry of War; the first and only foreigner to achieve such a position.

Munthe was an avid collector of Chinese works of arts, and his collection includes porcelain, paintings, costumes, and statues in bronze and marble. The collection now resides with the West Norway Museum of Decorative Art (Vestlandske Kunstindustrimuseum) in Bergen.

The Jordan Schnitzer Museum of Art  at the University of Oregon also holds a large number of works collected by  Munthe and later acquired by the Museum's founder, Gertrude Bass Warner (1863-1951).

Personal life
In 1919, he married  German-born  Alexandra Ethelred  von Herder (1867-1920 ).  She was the widow of  Frederick William Grantham (1870–1915) and was the mother of Sir Alexander Grantham (1899–1978) who was Governor of Hong Kong from 1947 to 1957.

Munthe died during 1935 in Beijing and was buried at the  British Municipal Cemetery in Tientsin.

References

External links
 

1864 births
1935 deaths
Military personnel from Bergen
Norwegian Army personnel
Norwegian art collectors
Collectors of Asian art
20th-century art collectors
Norwegian expatriates in China
Customs officials
Chinese military personnel of the First Sino-Japanese War
Military personnel of the Boxer Rebellion
People of the 1911 Revolution
Qing dynasty generals
Norwegian generals
Recipients of the Cross of St. George
Commanders First Class of the Order of the Dannebrog
Commanders First Class of the Order of the Sword
Commandeurs of the Légion d'honneur